Eric Palmgren (9 August 1916 – 31 May 2015) was a Finnish former sailor who competed in the 1948 Summer Olympics.

References

1916 births
2015 deaths
Finnish male sailors (sport)
Olympic sailors of Finland
Sailors at the 1948 Summer Olympics – Firefly